The Postmaster General for Scotland, based in Edinburgh, was responsible for the postal service in the Kingdom of Scotland from approximately 1616 until the Act of Union unified Scotland and England in 1707, creating a new state called the Kingdom of Great Britain. From 1711, the posts in Scotland were the responsibility of the Deputy Postmaster General for Scotland, until in 1831, that position was subsumed into the duties of the Postmaster General of the United Kingdom.

History
The Union of the Crowns took place in 1603 and on 5 May a public postal system was approved by the Parliament of Scotland's Act William III c.31, to be set up between Berwick, just south of the Scottish border, and Edinburgh. At some time after 1603 the post of Postmaster General for Scotland was established by the Privy Council of Scotland with the first appointment mentioned in 1616 as Sir William Seton. From Privy Council records, Seton appears to have held the position until 1631, or 1633, though a 1641 Act of the Scottish Parliament ratifies his appointment for life as "His Majesty's cheefe post maister of all his Hienes postmaisteres ..." at a salary of £500 per annum. No new appointment was made until 1649 when the Commonwealth took over the post in Scotland.

Following the 1660 restoration of the monarchy, one Patrick Grahame became Postmaster General for Scotland under the Privy Seal of King Charles II from 14 September 1662 for his lifetime at the same salary of £500 per annum: officium precipui magistri cursoris lie Postmaster-Generall et Censoris omnium cursorum dicti regni Scotie. Grahame's son John obtained the position after his father's death in 1674 at a new salary of £1,000 per annum and held the office until 1689.

In August 1695 an Act of William III again established a General Post Office in Scotland to be set up in Edinburgh: 

The Post Office Act of Anne, 1710, repealed the 1695 Act of William and united the Post Offices of England and Scotland under one Postmaster-General as the Postmaster-General of Great Britain; from 1711 in Scotland the office was managed by a deputy postmaster general. The first Deputy Postmaster General for Scotland was George Main who held the office of Postmaster General for Scotland until 1707 and between then and his appointment as deputy he was the Post Office Manager for Scotland During his tenure between May and September 1707 he is described as the Postmaster of North Britain.

Curiously, some early 19th century Edinburgh Post Office directories were published under the patronage of the Postmaster General of Scotland by Robert Trotter, Francis Gray, Earl of Caithness and Sir David Wedderburn even though that post no longer officially existed.

The Scottish postmaster generalship, as with the same office in Ireland, was finally abolished, not at the time of the Act of Union in 1800 but in 1831. The 1831 published Post Office Annual Directory was issued under the patronage of Sir Edward Smith Lees, Secretary to the General Post Office for Edinburgh who had been moved to Scotland when he swopped his Irish secretaryship with his counterpart Augustus Godby during the reforms of the Irish Post Office in 1831.

Postmasters-General in Scotland

Deputy Postmasters-General in Scotland

See also
 Postmasters General of Ireland
 Postmaster General of the United Kingdom

References

External links
 Scottish Post Office directories National Library of Scotland
 First English Mails Old and New Edinburgh

Scotland
Political office-holders in Scotland
Postal system of the United Kingdom
United Kingdom Postmasters General
Ministerial offices in Scotland